Kabiru Bala (born 7 January 1964) is a Nigerian professor, academic, construction engineer and the current vice chancellor of Ahmadu Bello University Zaria.

Early life and education 

Kabiru was educated at Ahmadu Bello University, Zaria with a bachelor of building engineering and technology in 1985. He obtained his masters degree and PhD in the same Ahmadu Bello University, Zaria. He has written 80 publications and has attended many international conferences.

Career 

Kabiru is now the current vice chancellor of Ahmadu Bello University Zaria. He held numerous positions within the university.

References 

1964 births
Vice-Chancellors of Nigerian universities
Nigerian engineers
Ahmadu Bello University alumni
Academic staff of Ahmadu Bello University
Living people